Bharati College, founded in 1971 as Bharati Mahila College, is a women's college affiliated to the University of Delhi. The college caters to more than 2000 women students. It is located in the Janakpuri district of New Delhi. The college offers Bachelor's courses in Literature, humanities, science and commerce. It is well connected with other parts of the city by various means of transport. Dr. Rekha Sapra is currently the acting principal of the college. Admission to Bharati College is given on the basis of Delhi University cut offs released each year for different courses.

Courses Offered
The college offers the following courses

BA Honours in English
BCom with Honours in Commerce
BA Honours in Political Science
BA Honours in Hindi
BA Honours in History
BA Honours in Sanskrit
BA Honours in Psychology
BSC Honours in Mathematics
BA Honours in Journalism
BA Honours in Psychology. Bharati College is one of the few colleges in India that provides a degree in BA(Hons) Journalism.

BA Programme

MA Hindi

And some other courses like foreign languages and computer courses.

References

Universities and colleges in Delhi
1971 establishments in Delhi
Educational institutions established in 1971
Delhi University